Stubno  is a village in Przemyśl County, Subcarpathian Voivodeship, in south-eastern Poland, close to the border with Ukraine. It is the seat of the gmina (administrative district) called Gmina Stubno.

The village has a population of 1,400.

References

Stubno